Istvan Korpa (born December 24, 1945) is a male former international table tennis player from Serbia.

He won a bronze medal at the 1969 World Table Tennis Championships in the Swaythling Cup (men's team event) with Zlatko Cordas, Antun Stipančić, Dragutin Šurbek and Edvard Vecko for Yugoslavia.

Two years later he won a bronze medal at the 1971 World Table Tennis Championships in the Swaythling Cup (men's team event) with Milivoj Karakašević, Cordas, Stipančić and Šurbek.

He also won nine European Table Tennis Championships medals. He was later a very successful coach.

See also
 List of table tennis players
 List of World Table Tennis Championships medalists

References

Yugoslav table tennis players
Serbian male table tennis players
1945 births
Living people
World Table Tennis Championships medalists
People from Senta